Kutafin Moscow State Law University  (MSAL) is a coeducational and public research university located in Moscow, Russia. It was founded on 1931. MSAL was renamed after Oleg Kutafin in 2012 and was then known as Kutafin University.  Its current rector is Viktor Blazheev.

History

The university’s history starts in 1931 when Central correspondence courses on Soviet law were established. It developed initially as All-USSR correspondence institute of law assuring studies for a degree of law. A major part of Russian jurisprudence élite graduated from the University.

In December 2011, Kutafin Moscow State Law University celebrated its 80th anniversary. Today it is one of the largest law schools in Russia. In 2020 Forbes Magazine ranked MSAL #3 in the Leading in the Forbes Factor. In 2021, the university has been included in the Moscow International rating «The Three University Missions» (MosIUR): The Best Universities in Moscow Category (top-33)

Current activity
Since its foundation the University has grown to become the University it is today, educating around 17,000 students; delivering courses that provide knowledge of the subject matters and practical skills; making efforts to improve the law and legal institutions through teaching, research, and other forms of public service.

Kutafin Moscow State Law University assured training and graduation of more than 180 thousand specialists of higher legal education, majority of alumni has resumed its extensive cooperation program with the university.

Presently, the educational process and scientific researches are guaranteed by 11 institutes, 5 branches and 30 departments. More than 20 schools of thought and scientific directions present the foundation of the University’s performance. The professorate and other faculty number about 1000 professors, with one corresponding member of the Russian University of Sciences included, over 190 Doctors of Science and 560 candidates of science, 33 Honoured Jurists of the Russian Federation, 16 Honoured Science Workers of the Russian Federation, over 100 honorary members of the University. Moreover, students receive training directly from Mr. Serkov, the First Deputy Head of the Supreme Court’s Chief, and Mrs. Novoselova, President of Intellectual Property Court. The faculty has been long committed to provide not only full tuition, but also intensive mentoring to develop tomorrow’s leaders and to prepare them for responsible and productive lives of the legal profession.

Institution
For years, University has been working with diligence to create a special offer in higher education in the region with establishing of a range of Institutes: 
Institute of Law 
Institute of International Law
Institute of Public Prosecution
Corresponding Law Institute
Institute of Court Expertise
Institute of Permanent Education
Institute of Additional Professional Education
Institute of Financial and Banking Law
Institute of Advocacy
Institute of Energy Law
Business Law Institute

International cooperation
Kutafin University is currently integrated into the world education as widening international cooperation is an important policy area in the University’s overall policy.

The University has established international relations with foreign institutes and think tanks of CIS countries, European and Asian nations and the United States of America. Interchange agreements were concluded with the Universities of Bonn, Potsdam, London and Wales.

Staff and students
Currently the university employs more than 200 academics and 1,000 support staff. More than 16,000 undergraduates and 1,000 advanced degree candidates are enrolled.

Notable graduates

Boris Slutsky was a Soviet poet of Russian language
Dzhangir Kerimov is an Azerbaijani-Russian lawyer, Dr. of Laws (LL.D.), Professor, corresponding member of the Russian Academy of Sciences (since 1966)
Vladimir Kryuchkov was a Soviet lawyer, diplomat and head of the KGB
Gennady Yanayev was a Soviet Russian politician and statesman whose career spanned the rules of Khrushchev, Brezhnev, Andropov and Chernenko, and culminated during the Gorbachev years
Boris Kuznetsov - is a prominent Russian lawyer who has acted in many notable criminal and human rights cases, and who has been persecuted by the Russian authorities
Mikhail Barshchevsky -  plenipotentiary representative of the Russian Federation in the Constitutional Court
Vladimir Vasil'ev - since 2012 is Deputy Chairmen of the State Duma
Alexander Chekalin was the First Deputy Minister of the Interior (police minister) from 2004
Yuri Baturin - is a Russian cosmonaut
Alexander Korzhakov - is a former KGB general who served as Boris Yeltsin's bodyguard, confidant, and adviser for eleven years
Olga Egorova - since 2000 is the Head Moscow City Court
Sergey Morozov is the governor of Ulyanovsk Oblast in Russia. He was elected in 2004; his term started in 2005
Sergey Sobyanin is the Mayor of Moscow
Dmitry Yakubovskiy - is a businessperson
Anatoly Kucherena - is a Russian attorney representing Edward Snowden’s interests in the Russian Federation, a public figure, Doctor of Law, professor
Stanislav Markelov - was a Russian human rights lawyer
Igor Lebedev is the chairman of the LDPR parliamentary group of the Russian State Duma and the LDPR Youth Organization
Roman Artyuhin - since 2007 is the Head of Treasury Russia
Nikolay Tsiskaridze - was a premier dancer of the Bolshoi Ballet, is The Rector of Vaganova Academy of Russian Ballet
Aleksander Torshin - was the acting Chairman of the Federation Council of Russia
Roman Abramovich - is a Russian businessman, investor and politician
Pavel Bure - is a retired Russian professional ice hockey right winger
Dmitry Livanov - is a Russian Doctor of Physics, professor, former rector of Moscow Institute of Steel and Alloys, and the Minister of Education and Science of the Russian Federation since May 2012 to August 2016

See also 
 Seven Sisters (Moscow)
 Education in Russia
 List of early modern universities in Europe
 List of universities in Russia
 List of rectors of the Moscow State University

Notes and references

External links 
 Kutafin Moscow State Law University

Kutafin Moscow State Law University
Universities in Moscow
1931 establishments in Russia
Universities and institutes established in the Soviet Union
Law schools in Russia
Educational institutions established in 1931